Trey Day is the second studio album by American R&B recording artist Trey Songz. It was released on October 1, 2007, by Atlantic Records. The album debuted at number 11 on the US Billboard 200, with 73,000 copies sold in the first week of release. It was a bit of the improvement than his previous album I Gotta Make It (2005); which debuted at number 20 on the US Billboard 200. Trey Day was met with mixed reviews by critics. The album was supported by four singles: "Wonder Woman", "Can't Help but Wait", "Last Time", and "Missin' You".

Singles
The lead single: "Wonder Woman", was produced by Danja and officially released on February 13, 2007.

The second single: "Can't Help but Wait", was officially released on August 6, 2007. Being produced by Stargate, it became his highest charting single on the US Billboard Hot 100, peaking at number 14 until his 2010 single: "Bottoms Up", at number 6.

The third single: "Last Time", was produced by Bryan-Michael Cox with Kendrick "WyldCard" Dean, and officially released on January 25, 2008.

The fourth single: "Missin' You", which again was also produced by Stargate, officially released on June 20, 2008.

Commercial performance
Trey Day debuted at number 11 on the US Billboard 200 chart, selling 73,000 copies in the first week. On July 20, 2016, the album was certified gold by the Recording Industry Association of America (RIAA) for combined sales and equivalent album units over 500,000 units in the United States.

Track listing
Track list credits

Notes
(*) Denotes co-producer.

Personnel
Tremaine Aldon Neverson (Trey Songz) – background vocals, executive producer, vocal producer
Troy Taylor  – background vocals, engineer, executive producer, vocal engineer, vocal producer
Phillip Lamont "Taj" Jackson, Candice Nelson  – background vocals
Mikkel Storleer Eriksen  – background vocals, engineer, instrumentation
Bryan-Michael Cox  – bass, drums, horn, keyboards, programming
Vidal Davis, Andre Harris  – instrumentation
Kevin Hanson  – guitars
Kevin Liles  – executive producer
Herb Powers  – mastering
Marcella Araica, Vincent Dilorenzo, Matt Marrin, Sam Thomas  – engineers
Dylan "3-D" Dresdow, Vincent Dilorenzo, Jimmy Douglass, Fabian Marasciullo, Marco Reyes, Matt Marrin, Dave Pensado, Phil Tan  – mixing

Charts

Weekly charts

Year-end charts

Certifications

References

2007 albums
Albums produced by Bryan-Michael Cox
Albums produced by Danja (record producer)
Albums produced by Dre & Vidal
Albums produced by Eric Hudson
Albums produced by Jimmy Jam and Terry Lewis
Albums produced by R. Kelly
Albums produced by Maejor
Albums produced by Stargate
Albums produced by Troy Taylor (record producer)
Atlantic Records albums
Trey Songz albums